Western Approaches is a 1944 docufiction film directed by Pat Jackson and was Crown Film Unit's first Technicolor production. The music is by Clifton Parker.

It is the fictional account of 22 British Merchant Navy sailors adrift in a lifeboat. They are able to signal by Morse code their position.  A nearby U-boat receives the signal along with a friendly vessel which changes course to go to their rescue. The captain of the U-boat decides to wait in ambush with its two remaining torpedoes. Before the rescue ship arrives, the U-boat's periscope is spotted by the lifeboat. The U-boat fires its torpedoes just as the rescue vessel is alerted to the U-boat's presence.

Although set in the North Atlantic, much of it was shot in the Irish Sea. Sailors rather than professional actors were used.

Trade papers reported that the film among those "doing well" at the British box office in 1945.

References

External links 

Review of film at Variety

1944 films
British docufiction films
Films directed by Pat Jackson
World War II naval films
1940s English-language films
1940s British films